Charles Martin Wamika is a Roman Catholic priest, who is the Bishop of Jinja, since 2 March 2010.

Early life and priesthood
Wamika was born on 12 August 1953, in present-day Budaka District in the Eastern Region of Uganda. He studied at St. Peter's Claver College, then in 1964 he transferred to St. Pius X Minor Seminary, in Nagongera. He studied philosophy at Alokolum National Seminary, in Gulu, before he studied theology at the National Seminary of Ggaba, in Kampala.

He was ordained priest on 22 September 1979 at Tororo. He served as priest in the Roman Catholic Archdiocese of Tororo, until 18 October 1993.

As bishop
He was appointed bishop on 18 October 1993, serving as Auxiliary Bishop of Tororo and as Titular Bishop of Tacapae. He was consecrated as bishop on 19 February 1994 at Tororo by Bishop James Odongo, Bishop of the Uganda Military, assisted by Archbishop Emmanuel Wamala of Kampala and Bishop Joseph Bernard Louis Willigers, Bishop of Jinja. On 20 March 2010 he was appointed bishop of the Roman Catholic Diocese of Jinja. He replaced Bishop Joseph B. Willigers, who retired, after 43 years of service as Bishop of the Diocese.

See also
 Uganda Martyrs
 Roman Catholicism in Uganda

References

External links

Congregation of Holy Cross: Seven Profess Final Vows in East Africa As of 8 January 2014. 

1953 births
Living people
20th-century Roman Catholic bishops in Uganda
21st-century Roman Catholic bishops in Uganda
People from Budaka District
Roman Catholic bishops of Jinja